Joseph Paul Lanza (born October 3, 1935), known as Paul, is a retired general contractor who built primarily on Cape Cod, Massachusetts, and in Simsbury, Connecticut. He built over 300 single family houses and 150 commercial construction projects.The best known is the John F. Kennedy Memorial in Hyannis, Massachusetts.   

The memorial was commissioned by the citizens of Barnstable, Massachusetts, and dedicated on July 8, 1966. Donald Durell was the architect and the sculptor Agop Agopoff created the left profile bust of President Kennedy on the front medallion. The memorial has a reflecting pool and lit fountain that is the water complement to the eternal flame at the John F. Kennedy Memorial in Arlington, Virginia. The engraved quote around the pool, "I believe it is important that this country sail and not lie still in the harbor,” is from JFK's Radio and Television Report to the American People on the State of the National Economy on August 13, 1962. Materials were sourced primarily from Cape Cod and the Northeastern United States.  

The son of the late Joseph B. and Mary P. Lanza, he was born in Southbridge, MA. After moving to West Hartford, CT, he attended parochial and public schools, graduating from Hall High School. He earned a BA in American Studies at St. Michael’s College in Vermont and took graduate courses at RISD, MIT, and Harvard.  

Paul served in the Navy on the destroyer USS John Paul Jones between the Korean and Vietnam Wars. Before moving to Cape Cod and entering the construction business in 1962, he was sports editor of the West Hartford News. In 1976, he moved to Simsbury to become executive director of the Connecticut Professional Golfers Association. He was a stockbroker with Merrill Lynch and then Kidder Peabody before returning to the construction industry. 

He redeveloped an old tobacco dormitory in Tariffville, Connecticut into a residential condominium known as Hayes Landing. The project received recognition from the National Wood Council. He later was principal of Cottage Furniture, which made sea chests, often given at naval retirements. 

Committed to public and volunteer service, he advised the US Secretary of Housing on implementing housing materials in US rural and foreign markets, served on the Barnstable (MA) School Building Committee and the Simsbury Building, Design Review, and Historic District committees, and is a Simsbury Food Bank volunteer. 

He and his wife, Susanne, live in Simsbury, Connecticut.

References

Living people
1935 births